Van Veghten's Bridge is a bridge spanning the Raritan River in Somerset County, New Jersey, connecting the Finderne section of Bridgewater with Manville.  The bridge carries four lanes of Somerset County Route 533 across the river and the flood plain.  In Manville the roadway is called North Main Street.  In Bridgewater, it becomes Finderne Avenue.

Background
The first bridge at this site, known as Van Veghten's after the land owner, Van Veghten, was built in the early 18th century, perhaps as early as 1733. It was later rebuilt in 1774.

It was noted in several events during the American Revolutionary War. On October 26, 1779, British Lieut. Col. John Graves Simcoe led a group of the Queen's Rangers and destroyed eighteen boats on the Raritan River at this site that were intended for use by the American General George Washington. On August 30–31, 1781, the French Army under command of the French general Comte de Rochambeau, marched over the bridge, along the route to Yorktown, Virginia.

History

The current bridge was first built in 1896 using stone arches and a Pratt through truss for the main span. In 1934, the through truss was removed and replaced with a stringer bridge.

See also
List of crossings of the Raritan River

References

External links
Van Veghten's Bridge

Bridges in Somerset County, New Jersey
Bridges over the Raritan River
Bridges completed in 1896
Bridges completed in 1914
Bridges completed in 2007
Road bridges in New Jersey